Iroquois-class homeodomain protein IRX-3, also known as Iroquois homeobox protein 3, is a protein that in humans is encoded by the IRX3 gene.

Discovery and name 

The Iroquois family of genes was discovered in Drosophila during a mutagenesis experiment designed to identify genes that affected the development of external sensory organs. When genes of this family were knocked out, the Drosophila flies expressed a unique patterning of bristles reminiscent of Iroquois American Indians, they were subsequently named after them. The molecular characteristics of these genes allowed the identification of homologs in C. elegans and several other vertebrates.

Function 

IRX3 is a member of the Iroquois homeobox gene family and plays a role in an early step of neural development. Members of this family appear to play multiple roles during pattern formation of vertebrate embryos.
Specifically, IRX3 contributes to pattern formation in the spinal cord where it translates a morphogen gradient into transcriptional events, and is directly regulated by NKX2-2. 
The Irx3 gene controls the subdivision of the neural territory by working together with various other homeodomain factors, all of these factors are expressed in partially overlapping domains along the dorsoventral axis in response to Sonic hedgehog molecules emanating from the floor plate. The combination of these signals defines five regions, each of which will give rise to five types of neurons (V0, V1, V2, MN, and V3). For example, the region that generates V2 neurons expresses both Irx3 and Nkx6.1, while that which forms MN neurons expresses Nkx6.1 alone. Irx3 overexpression in the MN domain transforms MN into V2 neurons.

Clinical significance

Association with obesity

Obesity-associated noncoding sequences within FTO interact with the promoter of IRX3 and FTO in human, mouse, and zebrafish. Obesity-associated single nucleotide polymorphisms are related to the expression of IRX3 (not FTO) in the human brain. A direct connection between the expression of IRX3 and body mass and composition was shown through the decrease in body weight of 25-30% in IRX3-deficient mice. This suggests that IRX3 influences obesity. Manipulation of IRX3 and IRX5 pathways has also been shown to decrease obesity markers in human cell cultures.
Genetic variants of FTO and IRX3 genes are in high linkage disequilibrium and are associated with obesity risk.

References

Further reading